The Brian Setzer Orchestra is the first studio album from the American swing revival band The Brian Setzer Orchestra, released in 1994.

Track listing 

 "Lady Luck" (Brian Setzer)
 "Ball and Chain" (Brian Setzer)
 "Sittin' On It All the Time" (Henry Bernard, Sydney Mann)
 "Good Rockin' Daddy" (Richard Berry, Joe Josea)
 "September Skies" (Bill Carter, Ruth Ellsworth Carter, Christine Schmidt, Brian Setzer)
 "Brand New Cadillac" (Vince Taylor)
 "There's a Rainbow 'Round My Shoulder" (Dave Dreyer, Al Jolson, Billy Rose)
 "Route 66" (Bobby Troup)
 "Your True Love" (Carl Lee Perkins)
 "A Nightingale Sang in Berkeley Square" (Eric Maschwitz, Manning Sherwin)
 "Straight Up" (Dave Lambert, O. O. Merritt, Brian Setzer)
 "Drink That Bottle Down" (Jim Phantom, Lee Rocker, Brian Setzer)

"Sittin' On It All the Time" includes re-recorded elements from "Monk's Dream" (Thelonious Monk) and "Take the "A" Train" (Billy Strayhorn)
"Brand New Cadillac" includes re-recorded elements from "Peter Gunn Theme" (Henry Mancini)
"Route 66" includes re-recorded elements from "Route 66 Television Theme" (Nelson Riddle)

Personnel
Brian Setzer - guitar, vocals
Bob Parr - bass
Gary Stockdale - piano
Bernie Dresel - drums
Michael Acosta - musical director, tenor saxophone
Bob Sandman - 2nd tenor saxophone
Ray Herrmann - 1st alto saxophone
Steve Fowler - 2nd alto saxophone
Don Roberts - baritone saxophone
Dan Fornero - lead trumpet
John Fumo, Les Lovitt, Ramon Flores - trumpet
Art Valasco - lead trombone
Bruce Fowler, Mark Jones - trombone
Dana Hughes - baritone trombone
Technical
Al Schmitt - recording, mixing
Maria DeGrassi-Colosimo - art direction
Maria Villar - graphic design

References 

1994 debut albums
The Brian Setzer Orchestra albums
Hollywood Records albums